Down on the Farm can refer to:

Film and television
 Down on the Farm (1920 film), a 1920 silent film 
 Down on the Farm (1921 film), a Felix the Cat animated film
 Down on the Farm (1935 film), a New Zealand film 
 Down on the Farm (1938 film), a film directed by Malcolm St. Clair
 Down on the Farm (1939 TV series), an early British television program that aired on BBC in 1939
 Down on the Farm (1941 film), a short film
 Down on the Farm (2015 TV series), a 2015 British television series that airs on CBeebies

Music
 "How Ya Gonna Keep 'em Down on the Farm (After They've Seen Paree)?", a World War I-era song
 Down on the Farm (album), an album by Little Feat
 "Down on the Farm", a song by Joe Walsh on his album There Goes the Neighborhood
 "Down on the Farm", a song by U.K. Subs later covered by Guns N' Roses
 "Down on the Farm" (Charley Pride song), 1985
 "Down on the Farm" (James Blundell song), 1992
 "Down on the Farm" (Tim McGraw song), 1994
 "Down on the Farm", a song by Parachute Express